This is a list of minister from B. S. Yeddyurappa cabinets starting from 12 November 2007 to  19 November 2007. B. S. Yeddyurappa is the leader of Bharatiya Janata Party was sworn in the Chief Ministers of Karnataka in 12 November 2007. Here is the list of the ministers of his ministry.

Cabinet Ministers

See also 

 Government of Karnataka
 Karnataka Legislative Assembly

References

Bharatiya Janata Party state ministries
2007 in Indian politics
Yediyurappa 01
2007 establishments in Karnataka
2007 disestablishments in India
Cabinets established in 2007
Cabinets disestablished in 2007